Gatis Eglītis (born 4 December 1978) is a Latvian politician, who from 3 June 2021 has served as  in the Kariņš cabinet. A member of The Conservatives, he served as a member of the Parliament of Latvia between 6 November 2018 and 8 June 2021.

References 

 Gatis Eglītis Cabinet of Ministers. Archived from the original June 5 2021. Retrieved June 15 2021.

1978 births
Living people
New Conservative Party (Latvia) politicians
Ministers of Welfare of Latvia
People from Dobele